Ernie Francis Jr. (born January 23, 1998) is an American sports car racing and stock car racing driver who currently competes in Indy NXT driving for Force Indy. He previously ran full time in the Trans-Am Series, running the 98 car for Breathless Racing, where he is a seven-time champion. In 2021, he competed in the Formula Regional Americas Championship running the 98 car for Future Star Racing, and in the inaugural Superstar Racing Experience, driving the No. 2 car. He became the youngest winner in the SRX series when he won at Lucas Oil Raceway. He secured 2nd place in the SRX championship. When he is not racing, he works at the family race shop - Breathless Racing Team - run by his father (Ernie Francis Sr.) and stepmother (Monica Zima Francis) in Davie, FL. He has also competed part-time in NASCAR in the past in both the Xfinity Series and the East Series.

Racing career

NASCAR Xfinity Series

In 2017, Francis Jr. made his NASCAR debut, driving the No. 13 Toyota for MBM Motorsports in a partnership with NextGen Motorsports at Road America. He started 38th and finished 39th due to engine problems.

NASCAR K&N Pro Series East

In 2018, Francis Jr. began racing in the Pro Series East, driving the No. 42 Toyota for Max Siegel's Rev Racing team. He began on the pole position at Millville and finished second to Will Rodgers. He returned for the Watkins Glen race, where he started 19th and finished 11th.

In 2019, Francis Jr. returned to Siegel's Rev Racing team as part of the Drive for Diversity driver development program.

Trans Am Series

Francis Jr. has won seven consecutive Trans-Am Series championships.

Indy Lights
For the 2022 racing season, Francis Jr. signed to drive for the Force Indy team in the Indy Lights series. Francis Jr.'s hiring came as part of an initiative by the Force Indy team to give African-American drivers and mechanics opportunities to enter open-wheel racing.

Motorsports career results

Career Summary

SCCA National Championship Runoffs

NASCAR
(key) (Bold – Pole position awarded by qualifying time. Italics – Pole position earned by points standings or practice time. * – Most laps led.)

Xfinity Series

K&N Pro Series East

Superstar Racing Experience
(key) * – Most laps led. 1 – Heat 1 winner. 2 – Heat 2 winner.

American open-wheel racing results
(key)

Indy Lights/Indy NXT

 Season still in progress

References

External links

 

1998 births
Living people
NASCAR drivers
Indy Lights drivers
Racing drivers from Florida
Racing drivers from Miami
People from Davie, Florida
SCCA National Championship Runoffs winners
Sportspeople from Broward County, Florida
Formula Regional Americas Championship drivers
Trans-Am Series drivers
HMD Motorsports drivers